The World Chess Championship 1990 was played between Garry Kasparov and Anatoly Karpov. It was the fifth and final Kasparov–Karpov championship match, and saw Kasparov win by a single point.

1987 Interzonal tournaments
Three Interzonals were held in the summer of 1987, with 16 to 18 players playing in each and the top three scorers from each qualifying.

{| class="wikitable"
|+ June–July 1987 Interzonal, Subotica
|-
!  !! !! Rating !! 1 !! 2 !! 3 !! 4 !! 5 !! 6 !! 7 !! 8 !! 9 !! 10 !! 11 !! 12 !! 13 !! 14 !! 15 !! 16 !! Total !! Tie break
|- style="background:#ccffcc;"
| 1 || align=left| || 2570 || - || 1 || ½ || ½ || ½ || 1 || 1 || ½ || ½ || 0 || 1 || ½ || 1 || ½ || 1 || 1 || 10½ || 74.25
|- style="background:#ccffcc;"
| 2 || align=left| || 2615 || 0 || - || ½ || ½ || 1 || 1 || ½ || 1 || ½ || 1 || ½ || 1 || ½ || 1 || ½ || 1 || 10½ || 73.00
|- style="background:#ccffcc;"
| 3 || align=left| || 2550 || ½ || ½ || - || 0 || 1 || ½ || ½ || ½ || 1 || ½ || 1 || 1 || ½ || 1 || 1 || 1 || 10½ || 70.75
|-
| 4 || align=left| || 2605 || ½ || ½ || 1 || - || ½ || ½ || 1 || ½ || ½ || ½ || 1 || 1 || ½ || 1 || 0 || 1 || 10 || 72.50
|-
| 5 || align=left| || 2580 || ½ || 0 || 0 || ½ || - || ½ || ½ || ½ || 1 || ½ || 1 || 1 || 1 || 1 || 1 || 1 || 10 || 63.25
|-
| 6 || align=left| || 2495 || 0 || 0 || ½ || ½ || ½ || - || ½ || ½ || ½ || 1 || 0 || 1 || ½ || 1 || 1 || 1 || 8½ || 
|-
| 7 || align=left| || 2505 || 0 || ½ || ½ || 0 || ½ || ½ || - || ½ || 0 || ½ || 1 || 1 || ½ || ½ || 1 || 1 || 8 || 
|-
| 8 || align=left| || 2550 || ½ || 0 || ½ || ½ || ½ || ½ || ½ || - || ½ || 0 || 0 || 1 || 1 || ½ || 1 || ½ || 7½ || 52.00
|-
| 9 || align=left| || 2570 || ½ || ½ || 0 || ½ || 0 || ½ || 1 || ½ || - || 1 || 0 || 0 || 1 || 0 || 1 || 1 || 7½ || 51.00
|-
| 10 || align=left| || 2540 || 1 || 0 || ½ || ½ || ½ || 0 || ½ || 1 || 0 || - || 1 || 0 || 0 || ½ || ½ || 1 || 7 || 
|-
| 11 || align=left| || 2505 || 0 || ½ || 0 || 0 || 0 || 1 || 0 || 1 || 1 || 0 || - || ½ || 0 || 1 || ½ || 1 || 6½ || 
|-
| 12 || align=left| || 2465 || ½ || 0 || 0 || 0 || 0 || 0 || 0 || 0 || 1 || 1 || ½ || - || 1 || 1 || 1 || 0 || 6 || 
|-
| 13 || align=left| || 2575 || 0 || ½ || ½ || ½ || 0 || ½ || ½ || 0 || 0 || 1 || 1 || 0 || - || ½ || 0 || ½ || 5½ || 
|-
| 14 || align=left| || 2495 || ½ || 0 || 0 || 0 || 0 || 0 || ½ || ½ || 1 || ½ || 0 || 0 || ½ || - || 1 || ½ || 5 || 
|-
| 15 || align=left| || 2425 || 0 || ½ || 0 || 1 || 0 || 0 || 0 || 0 || 0 || ½ || ½ || 0 || 1 || 0 || - || ½ || 4 || 
|-
| 16 || align=left| || 2310 || 0 || 0 || 0 || 0 || 0 || 0 || 0 || ½ || 0 || 0 || 0 || 1 || ½ || ½ || ½ || - || 3 || 
|}

In the first tournament in Subotica, Sax, Short, and Speelman qualified. Lubomir Kavalek withdrew after six rounds; his results are not included in the totals for the other players. Robert Hübner was invited, but declined to participate. As a result, Ribli had a free day during the last round. To show his displeasure, he refused to take part in a playoff against Tal, which could have been important, if a reserve spot had opened up in the Candidates Tournament.

{| class="wikitable"
|+ July–August 1987 Interzonal, Szirak
|-
!  !! !! Rating !! 1 !! 2 !! 3 !! 4 !! 5 !! 6 !! 7 !! 8 !! 9 !! 10 !! 11 !! 12 !! 13 !! 14 !! 15 !! 16 !! 17 !! 18 !! Total !! Tie break
|- style="background:#ccffcc;"
| 1 || align=left| || 2575 || - || ½ || ½ || ½ || 1 || 1 || ½ || 1 || ½ || 0 || ½ || 1 || 1 || ½ || 1 || 1 || 1 || 1 || 12½ || 97.25
|- style="background:#ccffcc;"
| 2 || align=left| || 2550 || ½ || - || ½ || ½ || ½ || ½ || 1 || 1 || ½ || 1 || 1 || ½ || 0 || 1 || 1 || 1 || 1 || 1 || 12½ || 96.50
|- style="background:#ccffcc;"
| 3 || align=left| || 2615 || ½ || ½ || - || ½ || 1 || ½ || 0 || 1 || 1 || 1 || 1 || 1 || 1 || 1 || ½ || ½ || ½ || ½ || 12 || 98.50
|-
| 4 || align=left| || 2585 || ½ || ½ || ½ || - || ½ || 0 || 1 || ½ || 1 || 1 || 1 || 1 || ½ || 1 || 0 || 1 || 1 || 1 || 12 || 92.50
|-
| 5 || align=left| || 2630 || 0 || ½ || 0 || ½ || - || ½ || ½ || ½ || ½ || 1 || ½ || 1 || ½ || 1 || 1 || 1 || 1 || 1 || 11 || 
|-
| 6 || align=left| || 2600 || 0 || ½ || ½ || 1 || ½ || - || ½ || 1 || ½ || ½ || ½ || ½ || 1 || 1 || ½ || ½ || ½ || 1 || 10½ || 
|-
| 7 || align=left| || 2625 || ½ || 0 || 1 || 0 || ½ || ½ || - || ½ || ½ || ½ || 1 || ½ || ½ || 1 || 1 || ½ || ½ || 1 || 10 || 
|-
| 8 || align=left| || 2575 || 0 || 0 || 0 || ½ || ½ || 0 || ½ || - || ½ || 1 || ½ || 1 || 1 || 0 || 1 || ½ || 1 || 1 || 9 || 
|-
| 9 || align=left| || 2575 || ½ || ½ || 0 || 0 || ½ || ½ || ½ || ½ || - || 0 || ½ || ½ || 1 || 0 || ½ || 1 || 1 || 1 || 8½ || 61.75
|-
| 10 || align=left| || 2475 || 1 || 0 || 0 || 0 || 0 || ½ || ½ || 0 || 1 || - || 1 || 0 || ½ || 0 || 1 || 1 || 1 || 1 || 8½ || 59.75
|-
| 11 || align=left| || 2475 || ½ || 0 || 0 || 0 || ½ || ½ || 0 || ½ || ½ || 0 || - || 1 || ½ || ½ || 1 || ½ || ½ || 1 || 7½ || 52.75
|-
| 12 || align=left| || 2520 || 0 || ½ || 0 || 0 || 0 || ½ || ½ || 0 || ½ || 1 || 0 || - || 1 || ½ || 1 || 0 || 1 || 1 || 7½ || 51.75
|-
| 13 || align=left| || 2540 || 0 || 1 || 0 || ½ || ½ || 0 || ½ || 0 || 0 || ½ || ½ || 0 || - || 1 || ½ || ½ || 1 || ½ || 7 || 55.00
|-
| 14 || align=left| || 2495 || ½ || 0 || 0 || 0 || 0 || 0 || 0 || 1 || 1 || 1 || ½ || ½ || 0 || - || ½ || 1 || 0 || 1 || 7 || 49.75
|-
| 15 || align=left| || 2480 || 0 || 0 || ½ || 1 || 0 || ½ || 0 || 0 || ½ || 0 || 0 || 0 || ½ || ½ || - || ½ || 1 || 1 || 6 || 
|-
| 16 || align=left| || 2485 || 0 || 0 || ½ || 0 || 0 || ½ || ½ || ½ || 0 || 0 || ½ || 1 || ½ || 0 || ½ || - || 0 || 1 || 5½ || 
|-
| 17 || align=left| || 2370 || 0 || 0 || ½ || 0 || 0 || ½ || ½ || 0 || 0 || 0 || ½ || 0 || 0 || 1 || 0 || 1 || - || ½ || 4½ || 
|-
| 18 || align=left| || 2310 || 0 || 0 || ½ || 0 || 0 || 0 || 0 || 0 || 0 || 0 || 0 || 0 || ½ || 0 || 0 || 0 || ½ || - || 1½ || 
|}

In the Szirák tournament, Valery Salov and Jóhann Hjartarson finished at the top of the table, while Lajos Portisch and John Nunn tied for third. The last place in the Candidates Tournament was decided in a separate playoff in Budapest, with Portisch defeating Nunn 4–2.

{| class="wikitable"
|+ August 1987 Interzonal, Zagreb
|-
!  !! !! Rating !! 1 !! 2 !! 3 !! 4 !! 5 !! 6 !! 7 !! 8 !! 9 !! 10 !! 11 !! 12 !! 13 !! 14 !! 15 !! 16 !! 17 !! Total !! Tie break
|- style="background:#ccffcc;"
| 1 || align=left| || 2630 || - || ½ || 1 || 0 || ½ || ½ || 0 || 1 || 1 || 1 || 1 || 1 || ½ || ½ || 1 || ½ || 1 || 11 || 
|- style="background:#ccffcc;"
| 2 || align=left| || 2540 || ½ || - || ½ || ½ || 1 || 1 || 0 || ½ || 1 || 0 || ½ || 1 || 1 || 1 || 1 || ½ || 0 || 10 || 80.75
|- style="background:#ccffcc;"
| 3 || align=left| || 2600 || 0 || ½ || - || 1 || ½ || ½ || 1 || 0 || 0 || 1 || 1 || 1 || ½ || 0 || 1 || 1 || 1 || 10 || 73.50
|-
| 4 || align=left| || 2555 || 1 || ½ || 0 || - || 1 || ½ || ½ || ½ || ½ || ½ || ½ || 0 || ½ || ½ || 1 || 1 || 1 || 9½ || 71.00
|-
| 5 || align=left| || 2620 || ½ || 0 || ½ || 0 || - || ½ || 0 || ½ || 1 || ½ || 1 || ½ || 1 || 1 || ½ || 1 || 1 || 9½ || 67.50
|-
| 6 || align=left| || 2525 || ½ || 0 || ½ || ½ || ½ || - || ½ || ½ || ½ || ½ || ½ || 0 || 1 || 1 || 1 || 1 || 1 || 9½ || 67.50
|-
| 7 || align=left| || 2540 || 1 || 1 || 0 || ½ || 1 || ½ || - || ½ || 0 || 1 || ½ || ½ || 0 || 0 || 1 || ½ || 1 || 9 || 
|-
| 8 || align=left| || 2595 || 0 || ½ || 1 || ½ || ½ || ½ || ½ || - || ½ || ½ || 1 || ½ || ½ || ½ || 0 || ½ || 1 || 8½ || 65.25
|-
| 9 || align=left| || 2575 || 0 || 0 || 1 || ½ || 0 || ½ || 1 || ½ || - || ½ || 0 || 1 || 1 || ½ || 0 || 1 || 1 || 8½ || 61.25
|-
| 10 || align=left| || 2545 || 0 || 1 || 0 || ½ || ½ || ½ || 0 || ½ || ½ || - || 0 || 1 || ½ || ½ || 1 || 1 || 1 || 8½ || 59.50
|-
| 11 || align=left| || 2575 || 0 || ½ || 0 || ½ || 0 || ½ || ½ || 0 || 1 || 1 || - || 1 || 0 || ½ || 1 || 1 || 1 || 8½ || 59.25
|-
| 12 || align=left| || 2495 || 0 || 0 || 0 || 1 || ½ || 1 || ½ || ½ || 0 || 0 || 0 || - || ½ || 1 || ½ || 1 || 1 || 7½ || 
|-
| 13 || align=left| || 2485 || ½ || 0 || ½ || ½ || 0 || 0 || 1 || ½ || 0 || ½ || 1 || ½ || - || ½ || ½ || ½ || ½ || 7 || 
|-
| 14 || align=left| || 2585 || ½ || 0 || 1 || ½ || 0 || 0 || 1 || ½ || ½ || ½ || ½ || 0 || ½ || - || 0 || 0 || 1 || 6½ || 
|-
| 15 || align=left| || 2555 || 0 || 0 || 0 || 0 || ½ || 0 || 0 || 1 || 1 || 0 || 0 || ½ || ½ || 1 || - || ½ || 1 || 6 || 
|-
| 16 || align=left| || 2455 || ½ || ½ || 0 || 0 || 0 || 0 || ½ || ½ || 0 || 0 || 0 || 0 || ½ || 1 || ½ || - || 1 || 5 || 
|-
| 17 || align=left| || 2320 || 0 || 1 || 0 || 0 || 0 || 0 || 0 || 0 || 0 || 0 || 0 || 0 || ½ || 0 || 0 || 0 || - || 1½ || 
|}

Viktor Korchnoi emerged as winner of the last tournament in Zagreb, ahead of Jaan Ehlvest and Yasser Seirawan. In an extra playoff in Havana in November, Nikolić took the place as reserve for the Candidates Tournament with 6 points, ahead of Granda (4) and Nogueiras (2). No reserve was needed, however.

1988–90 Candidates Tournament

In addition to nine players from the Interzonals, the top four of the previous Candidates Tournament (Sokolov, Timman, Vaganian, and Yusupov) qualified directly for this tournament. The Canadian organizers of the preliminary matches (which were held in Saint John, New Brunswick) nominated one player, (Spraggett). Finally, Karpov, the challenger in the previous cycle, was seeded into the quarterfinals.

Karpov won, once again facing Kasparov for the fifth and final time in seven years. Karpov later alleged that a Dutch sponsor had offered to pay him to lose the match against Timman.

1990 Championship match

The first twelve games were played in New York City (8 October – 7 November), the other twelve taking place in Lyon, France (26 November – 30 December).

{| class="wikitable" style="text-align:center"
|+World Chess Championship Match 1990
|-
! !! Rating !! 1 !! 2 !! 3 !! 4 !! 5 !! 6 !! 7 !! 8 !! 9 !! 10 !! 11 !! 12 !! 13 !! 14 !! 15 !! 16 !! 17 !! 18 !! 19 !! 20 !! 21 !! 22 !! 23 !! 24 !! Total
|-
| align=left |  || 2730
| ½ ||style="background:black; color:white"| 0 || ½ ||style="background:black; color:white"| ½ || ½ ||style="background:black; color:white"| ½ || 1 ||style="background:black; color:white"| ½ || ½ ||style="background:black; color:white"| ½ || ½ ||style="background:black; color:white"| ½ || ½ ||style="background:black; color:white"| ½ || ½ ||style="background:black; color:white"| 0 || 1 ||style="background:black; color:white"| 0 || ½ ||style="background:black; color:white"| 0 || ½ ||style="background:black; color:white"| ½ || 1 ||style="background:black; color:white"| ½ || 11½
|-
| align=left |  || 2800
|style="background:black; color:white"| ½ || 1 ||style="background:black; color:white"| ½ || ½ ||style="background:black; color:white"| ½ || ½ ||style="background:black; color:white"| 0 || ½ ||style="background:black; color:white"| ½ || ½ 
|style="background:black; color:white"| ½ || ½ ||style="background:black; color:white"| ½ || ½ ||style="background:black; color:white"| ½ || 1 ||style="background:black; color:white"| 0 || 1 ||style="background:black; color:white"| ½ || 1 ||style="background:black; color:white"| ½ || ½ ||style="background:black; color:white"| 0 || ½ || 12½
|}

Kasparov won the match and retained his title.

Flag controversy

Although still a Soviet citizen, Kasparov refused to play the Championship match under the flag of the USSR. Instead, he wanted to use the Russian flag (not the flag of the RSFSR, but the old tri-color) which, incidentally, would be re-adopted after the collapse of the Soviet Union a year later. Kasparov was indeed allowed to play with a small Russian tri-color at the table.

Notes

References

Further reading

Kasparov, Garry 2010. Garry Kasparov on Modern Chess, Part 4: Kasparov v Karpov 1988–2009. London: Everyman Chess.

External links
Game-by-game summary
Candidates matches
Interzonals: Subotica, Szirak, Zagreb

1990
1990 in chess
Chess in France
Chess in the United States
1990 in French sport
1990 in American sports
Sports competitions in New York City
Sports competitions in Lyon
Garry Kasparov